The Marion, Illinois tornado outbreak was a small, severe tornado outbreak that affected southern portions of the Midwestern United States on May 29, 1982.

Tornadoes touched down in the states of Illinois, Missouri, and Indiana, with Marion, Illinois, being the hardest hit.  Ten fatalities occurred there after the town took a direct hit from an F4 tornado. The outbreak also produced an F3 tornado affecting the Conant, Illinois, area and several weaker tornadoes in the surrounding area.

Meteorological synopsis

On the 12:00 UTC surface chart, a cold front was draped from Minnesota southwest across Iowa, Kansas, Oklahoma, and into Texas. A triple point was found just south of Des Moines, Iowa, with a warm front positioned east across northern Illinois and Indiana. An outflow boundary was draped over Central Illinois and Missouri from overnight convection that was decaying as it tracked east across the two states. This outflow boundary provided the potential for storms to redevelop.
By mid-afternoon, temperatures at Carbondale, Illinois, and Marion had risen to the middle and upper 80s°F with dew points near . At 1:03 p.m., a tornado watch was issued for the region. Later in the afternoon the National Weather Service in Saint Louis, Missouri, issued several severe weather warnings for Williamson County and surrounding counties. At 2:58 p.m. a severe thunderstorm warning was issued for Jackson County and Williamson County. At 3:00 p.m, a tornado was observed near Carterville, Illinois, prompting a tornado warning at 3:19 p.m.

Confirmed tornadoes

Marion, Illinois

The Marion tornado touched down near Carteville, at 3:00 p.m. resulting in damage to a subdivision near John A. Logan College. It then tracked into downtown Carterville then tracked southeast into Crainville, Illinois, after which it caused moderate damage to the area surrounding Williamson County Regional Airport. At 3:16 p.m. the tornado either formed a new funnel or changed course as it tracked into the west side of Marion along Illinois Route 13, causing extensive damage throughout the city. During this time the tornado was observed have a multiple-vortex structure with up to three subvortices swirling around the main tornado. The tornado struck a car along Interstate 57, causing it to explode. By 3:30 p.m. the tornado had exited the city and dissipated near Illinois Route 166. The tornado had destroyed the Shawnee Village Apartment Complex and severely damaged three shopping centers. It heavily damaged the area surrounding the Interstate 57 and Illinois Route 13 interchange including the Marion Ford dealership, and also damaged two schools, 648 homes, and 52 businesses. It caused 10 deaths and 181 injuries, and left over 1,000 people homeless.

See also
 List of North American tornadoes and tornado outbreaks

References

External links
 

F4 tornadoes by date
Marion,1982-05-29
Marion, Illinois tornado outbreak
Mario tornado outbreak
Marion, Illinois tornado outbreak
Tornadoes in Illinois
Marion, Illinois
Williamson County, Illinois